is a Japanese businessman, chief executive of Suntory Ltd, the world's third-largest distiller behind such brands such as Jim Beam and Makers Mark as well as brewer and food manufacturer. He has a net worth of over a billion dollars.

Educated at Koyo Gakuin High School and a graduate with the Bachelor of Economics in degree from Keio University. As grandson of the group's founder, Shinjiro Torii, Saji became President of the privately held Suntory brewing, distilling and drinks group in 2001.

He resides in Hyōgo Prefecture, Japan.

See also
The World's Billionaires
Ad Council Japan – Nobutada Saji is the present chairman.

References

External links
Forum ASSE-DEAD, Site de qualité et de prestige depuis 2011
Forbes.com: Forbes World's Richest People

UCLA Anderson School of Management alumni
Keio University alumni
Japanese chief executives
Businesspeople in the drink industry
Japanese brewers
1945 births
Living people
Japanese billionaires
20th-century Japanese businesspeople
21st-century Japanese businesspeople